Gillette (jih-LET) is a city in and the county seat of Campbell County, Wyoming, United States. The town was founded in 1891 as a major railway town on the Chicago, Burlington and Quincy Railroad.

The population was estimated at 32,030 as of July 1, 2019. Gillette's population increased 48% in the ten years after the 2000 census, which counted 19,646 residents after a boom in its local fossil fuel industries.

Gillette is centrally located in an area involved with the development of vast quantities of American coal, oil, and coalbed methane gas. The city calls itself the "Energy Capital of the Nation"; Wyoming provides nearly 35% of the nation's coal. However, a decline in coal use in the U.S. has led to a decline in the local economy, leading some local officials to look for other industries or employment opportunities. As a major economic hub for the county, the city is also a regional center for media, education, health, and arts.

History

Before its founding, Gillette started as Donkey Town, named after Donkey Creek, and then was moved and called Rocky Pile after Rocky Draw.

Gillette was founded in 1891 with the coming of the Chicago, Burlington & Quincy Railroad and incorporated on January 6, 1892, less than two years after Wyoming became a state. Chicago, Burlington & Quincy Railroad changed the name to Gillette for Edward Gillette, a surveyor for the company.

In November 1895, a fire destroyed most of the city. Only two saloons, two stores, and a restaurant survived. A group of families from Mathews County, Virginia and Gloucester County, Virginia settled in the town between 1895 and 1905, all of whom were members of the Episcopal Church, and there has been an Episcopalian presence in Gillette ever since. During this same era a group of immigrants from County Antrim, Ireland (in what has since become Northern Ireland) also settled in Gillette, these settlers were Presbyterians of Scottish descent, this population was referred to as "Scots-Irish" in the United States, however this was not a term used in Ireland. Norwegian immigrants arrived in the town during the same era, all of whom were Lutheran. There were also a small group of settlers from rural New England, these were old stock "Yankee" New Englanders who were members of the Congregational church.

In 1974, U.S. psychologist ElDean Kohrs used the town as the basic example of what he called the Gillette Syndrome, the social disruption that can occur in a community due to rapid population growth. During the 1960s, Gillette's population doubled from 3,580 to 7,194. Kohrs proposed that this fast increase caused increased crime, high costs of living, and weakened social and community bonds. Some of Kohrs's claims about the energy industry's influence have been disputed, since similar increases in divorce rates, welfare usage, and crime were also seen in other rapidly growing areas of the country.

Gillette annexed the census-designated place Antelope Valley-Crestview on January 1, 2018. Antelope Valley-Crestview's population was 1,658 at the 2010 census and it had an area of 4.9 mi2 (12.7 km²).

Geography

Gillette is located at  (44.282660, −105.505256).  It is situated between the Bighorn Mountains to the west and the Black Hills to the east, in the Powder River Basin.

Few trees were in Gillette when it was founded. The native trees, box elder and cottonwood, were found along creeks. The oldest surviving non-native trees were planted in the 1940s. The earliest were almost exclusively elm, cottonwood, white poplar, green ash, Colorado blue spruce, and Ponderosa pine. In the 1960s, crab apples, honey locust, catalpa, European mountain-ash, and other evergreens were planted. Nurseries started to sell trees in the 1970s, which further increased tree diversity.

Skyline

Climate
Gillette has a semiarid climate (Köppen climate classification BSk) and is in USDA plant hardiness zone 4b.

Demographics

As of 2000, the median income for a household in the city was $69,581, and for a family was $78,377. Males had a median income of $41,131 versus $22,717 for females. The per capita income for the city was $19,749. About 5.7% of families and 7.9% of the population were below the poverty line, including 6.2% of those under age 18 and 14.1% of those age 65 or over.

2010 census

As of the census of 2010,  29,087 people, 10,975 households, and 7,299 families resided in the city. The 12,153 housing units averaged . The racial makeup of the city was 92.2% White, 0.4% African American, 1.2% Native American, 0.7% Asian, 3.2% from other races, and 2.2% from two or more races. Hispanics or Latinos of any race were 9.5% of the population.

Of the 10,975 households, 38.9% had children under the age of 18 living with them, 49.2% were married couples living together, 10.3% had a female householder with no husband present, 7.0% had a male householder with no wife present, and 33.5% were not families. About 24.3% of all households were made up of individuals, and 4.7% had someone living alone who was 65 years of age or older. The average household size was 2.61 and the average family size was 3.09.

The median age in the city was 30.6 years. 28% of residents were under the age of 18; 10.9% were 18 to 24; 30.6% were 25 to 44; 24.8% were 45 to 64; and 5.8% were 65 years of age or older. The gender makeup of the city was 52.3% male and 47.7% female.

Arts and culture 
The volunteer board called the Mayor's Art Council runs the Avenues of Art program. The program pays artists to display sculptures for sale. Each year newly selected works are shown at the Donkey Creek Festival, where visitors can meet the artists. 113 sculptures are currently on display through the Avenues of Art program and 289 have been shown since 2004. Participating artists have included Jane DeDecker, Gary Lee Price, and Benjamin Victor.

A second program, Sculpture Walk, is operated by the Sculpture Committee. Started in 2018, it pays artists to display their sculptures for sale at Mount Pisgah Cemetery.

The city choose to increase investment in the arts program during the Great Recession and mayor Louise Carter-King describes the investment as a quality of life one.

Annual cultural events 

A free multi-day event, Donkey Creek Festival is held in every June at the Gillette College. It includes the Avenues of Arts reception, concert, car and motorcycle show, disc golf tournament, and 5K run and walk. There are art and food vendors and alcohol is available at a beer garden. The festival has grown significantly since starting in 2006.

The Gillette chapter of PFLAG hosts an annual pride event to support the local LGBTQ community. Previous years have included a potluck, picnic, and bowling. In 2019, PFLAG held the Pride Drag Show at AVA Community Art Center as part of its pride event.

Tourism 
In 2021, 7,338 people visited the Gillette Convention and Visitors Bureau.  While hunters always use the center, most visitors asked about coal mine tours and museums. Of the 569 visitors in 2018 who identified where they were from, 473 were from 46 states and 96 were from 23 other countries.

Sports

Wyoming Center at the CAM-PLEX

The Wyoming Center at the CAM-PLEX is a 9,000 seat event center located just outside of Gillette. Ground was broken in 2006 and it was completed in 2008.

It hosts both sporting and community events. The center can be divided into 3 rooms by using moveable soundproof walls; which retract if more space is needed for a certain event. More walls can further divide the center into 9 rooms. 

The Frontier and Equality Halls (located in the west and middle parts of the center, respectively) are used for various purposes; while the Spirit Hall (located on the east side) is used for ice skating and hockey. As stated before, it can be taken down should an event need more space.

The center currently hosts the National High School Finals Rodeo, amateur wrestling, and the Gillette Mustangs of the CIF. The Mustangs use the Equality Hall of the CAM-PLEX for their home games. The seating capacity is 4,000 for Mustangs games.

Other facilities

The Campbell County Recreation Center is a 190,000-ft2 facility that was established April 2010. This facility includes a 42-ft climbing wall resembling the Devils Tower National Monument. Also, an 81,000-ft2 field house that contains basketball courts, a six-lane track, swimming and diving facilities, and five indoor tennis courts.

The Campbell County Ice Arena contains an ice rink for ice hockey and ice skating plus an area for curling.

The Energy Capital Sports Complex site has four fast-pitch softball fields that can be converted for Little League baseball. The fields use Slitfilm synthetic turf with sand-rubber infill. A 28,000-ft2 protected spectator viewing area has a grass play area. A 2.4-mi recreation trail runs around the complex. Since the grand opening in 2015, the complex has hosted many tournaments, including the Razor City Showcase softball tournament and the 2016 Wyoming ASA State softball tournament.

Government

Gillette is governed by an elected mayor and a city council of six members. Gillette is split into three wards, each represented by two council members. The mayor and council members serve four-year terms.

Under the mayor and city council, the city government consists of the city attorney, municipal court, and city administration. The city administration consists of several departments and their divisions. The departments are Human Resources, Finance, Police, Development Services, Public Works, and Utilities.

The city council holds regular sessions on first and third Tuesday of every month in the Council Chambers at City Hall. The council also holds agenda review meetings and meetings before regular sessions. All meetings are open to the public except executive sessions. The council members are Gregory Schreurs and Tricia Simonson for Ward 1, Tim Carsrud and Billy Montgomery for Ward 2, Nathan McLeland and Shay Lundvall for Ward 3.

The sale and production of liquor is regulated by the city. The number of licenses is capped by population by state law and due to scarcity have been sold privately for as much as $300,000.

Education

Public education in Gillette is provided by Campbell County School District Number 1. It is home to Campbell County High School and Thunder Basin High School. Gillette College, a two-year college, is part of the Northern Wyoming Community College District.

Gillette has a public library, a branch of the Campbell County Public Library System.

Media

Gillette has one newspaper, the Gillette News-Record, published by Ann Kennedy Turner. It was originally two papers, the Gillette News and the Campbell County Record. The News-Record became a daily on July 14, 1975.

Gillette receives a strong digital television signal from KOPA-CD on channel 9, a moderate signal from KHSD-TV FOX on channel 5, and a weak signal from KQME ABC on channel 11 and KSGW-TV ABC on channel 12.

Gillette Public Access Television is Gillette's only TV station. It is a traditional PEG cable-access station operated by the city. It can be viewed on Charter Communications Cable channels 189 (Education), 190 (Public Access) and 192 (Government).

Infrastructure

Healthcare

Campbell County Memorial Hospital in Gillette is part of Campbell County Health. The hospital has 90 beds for acute care and is certified as an area trauma hospital.

Police

The Gillette Police Department consists of several divisions including Administration, Animal Control, Communications Center, Detectives Division which includes school resource officers (SRO), Evidence, Patrol Division, Records, and Victim Services. Police headquarters are located in City Hall, but the Animal Control division is located at the Animal Shelter on 950 W Warlow Dr. It consists of one Animal Control Supervisor, three Animal Control Officers, and two Animal Shelter Assistants. In addition to enforcing animal-related ordinances Animal Control sells pet licenses and acts as an animal shelter both housing pets and providing adoption services.

Military
At Gillette is a Wyoming National Guard armory. The A Battery, 2nd Battalion, 300th Field Artillery of the Wyoming National Guard are based in Casper, Gillette, and Lander. Also, the High Mobility Artillery Rocket System unit is based in Gillette. In recent years, soldiers from the 2nd Battalion, 300th Field Artillery have been deployed for Operation Iraqi Freedom, Operation Enduring Freedom, and Operation Freedom's Sentinel.

Transportation

Northeast Wyoming Regional Airport (GCC) is served by United Airlines operated by SkyWest Airlines. SkyWest currently operates six flights daily in and out of Gillette to Denver.

Highways

Notable people

 Jacob M. Appel (born 1973), author, poet, bioethicist, physician, lawyer, social critic
 Wade Brorby (born 1934), Gillette attorney, 1961–1988, United States federal appellate judge, 1988–
 John Chick (born 1982), professional football player, 2006–2017
 Alicia Craig (born 1982), distance runner
 Mike Enzi (1944–2021), Mayor of Gillette, 1975–1982, Wyoming State Senator, 1993–1997, and United States Senator from Wyoming, 1997–2021
 Joe Clifford Faust (born 1957), author
 Bob Harris (1915–1989), professional baseball player, 1938–42
 Burke Jackson (born 1949), Wyoming rancher, member of the Wyoming House of Representatives, 2004–06
 Mark Klaassen (born 1973), United States Attorney for the District of Wyoming
 Tom Lubnau (born 1958), Gillette attorney,  member of the Wyoming House of Representatives, 2005–2015, and Speaker of the Wyoming House of Representatives, 2013–2015
 Weston Ochse (born 1965), author
 Clint Oldenburg (born 1983), professional football player, 2007–2012
 Sue Wallis (1957–2014), poet, member of the Wyoming House of Representatives, 2007–2014
 Ryun Williams (born 1969), women's basketball head coach, Colorado State

In popular culture
In David Breskin's bildungsroman The Real Life Diary of a Boomtown Girl, Randi Bruce Harper is raised by parents in the Wyoming "oil-field service business"; as an adult, she drives a Wabco haul truck "down in the pit" while living with her husband in Gillette. Randi is a member of the first all-female blasting team, the "Boom-Boom Girls".

The Manticore facility is set in Gillette in the cyberpunk TV show Dark Angel and the books based on the show. Several fan fiction stories were written with Gillette central to the story because of the reference.

Marcus Sakey, in his Brilliance trilogy, lists Gillette as one of the three entrances (along with Rawlins and Shoshoni) to the New Canaan Holdfast, a large portion of Wyoming land owned by "abnorms".

In an interview with HorrorHound magazine, actor and musician Bill Moseley of the band Cornbugs said he was the great-grandson of Edward Gillette and named their studio album Donkey Town in honor of Chicago, Burlington & Quincy Railroad's decision to change the name of Donkey Town to Gillette as a reward for Edward Gillette's surveying work.

On December 5, 1998, Cheryl Trover, a math teacher at Campbell County High School, kidnapped and tied up her children, shot her husband John Trover with a .22-caliber pistol, and stabbed him to death with a hunting knife. She had stolen the gun from her lover of four years, John Riley, the principal at the same school. She then set fire to her pickup truck and lied to police about who committed her crimes. Once police suspected her, she killed herself with a .270 rifle at a friend's house. The events were dramatized in the crime story TV shows Redrum and Murderous Affairs.

The Drive-By Truckers's song "21st Century USA", from their 2020 album The Unraveling, is about a layover the band had in Gillette. It describes the bleak landscape of small US towns, and the hardships of living there.

Sister cities
After the mayor of Gillette visited a coal conference in China, a delegation from Yulin, Shaanxi, came to Gillette. These meetings eventually led both to become sister cities in 2012.

References

External links

 City of Gillette

 
Cities in Campbell County, Wyoming
Cities in Wyoming
County seats in Wyoming
Micropolitan areas of Wyoming
Mining communities in Wyoming
Populated places established in 1892
1892 establishments in Wyoming